Vittorio Vettori 
(1920–2004) was an Italian poet, writer and humanist, passionate spokesperson of ‘’Toscana Europea’’.
He has been author of more than 200 volumes of poetry, narrative, philosophy, literary criticism and Dante essays translated into diverse languages.

External links
 (The book of Vittorio Vettori published by Giubbe Rosse)
 (Florence Remembers Poet V. Vettori with a Plaque in his honor)

Italian male poets
1920 births
2004 deaths
20th-century Italian poets
20th-century Italian male writers
20th-century Italian philosophers